Dog's Life is a 2003 action-adventure video game developed by Frontier Developments exclusively for PlayStation 2, starring a dog named Jake.

Plot

The game opens in Clarksville, a city located in the American countryside. One day the protagonist, Jake the flatulent American Foxhound, witnesses Daisy, a Labrador Retriever, whom he has a crush on, being taken away by dog-catchers and resolves to rescue her. He follows them from the small town of Clarksville, to a mountain resort called Lake Minniwahwah, and finally to Boom City, using information gained from overhearing conversations between humans to track them down. Throughout his adventure, he is continually harassed by Killer, a Dobermann belonging to a dog catcher.

Eventually it is revealed that Miss Peaches, head of a cat food company, is arranging for dogs to be caught and smuggled to a factory where they will be made into her cat food. Jake ultimately makes it to the dog pound, and after rescuing a number of dogs and bribing Killer with bones, gains entry to the factory. There, he manages to prevent Daisy from being killed by the machinery as she is taken through it on a conveyor belt, only for Miss Peaches to appear with a shotgun. Jake farts, sending her falling onto the conveyor belt, killing her and turning her into cat food.

The epilogue reveals that all the stolen dogs were saved and that Jake and Daisy are together.

Gameplay

The game allows the player control or interact with over 15 dog breeds each with distinct traits and abilities. They handle things in different ways, that can also be used in challenges or puzzles.

The game is divided into three areas: Clarksville, a rural town; Lake Minniwahwah, a ski resort; and Boom City. These are then divided into smaller areas such as districts or farms. Humans willing to give missions in exchange for bones populate every area. Bones can also be found buried underground or hiding somewhere. Bones are used to increase your stats, which will make it easier to complete missions.

Certain smells picked up through the game's "Smellovision" will activate challenges against a local dog. In each small section of the game there are four challenges, two of which are to find eight smells of the same colour and compete against a local dog. These missions include races, obedience trials, tug-of-war games and a territorial game where the player must run around urinating in marked areas to obtain territory.

There are also salons in some levels where Jake can get his coat cleaned and brushed. He also gains a shiny new collar with a silver 'J' at the front.

Once these dogs are beaten, the player is able to take control of that dog and use their special abilities to find other bones. Other challenges include scent-collecting challenges, and a minigame called "Doggy Do", where the player must copy the moves of the local dog. There are also dangers in certain areas, such as the dog catcher and his Doberman. The player must also keep Jake healthy by feeding him, allowing him to defecate and coax people into giving Jake snacks by growling and barking or performing tricks unlocked by doing the obedience trials. Jake is able to do a range of tricks including begging, sitting, lying down and marking his territory.

Jake can interact with many characters including: chasing, shaking and throwing chickens, stealing sausages, and shaking kittens.

Reception

Dog's Life received "mixed" reviews according to video game review aggregator Metacritic.

Eurogamer found the game amusing, but felt that it offered little for experienced gamers, being aimed at a younger audience. They praised the game's "warm sense of humour" and "cute visuals" and found the idea of controlling a dog to be "actually quite cool". GameSpot said, "There's not a whole lot to Dog's Life, but what there is entertaining enough, and it certainly lets you do things you can't do in just about any other game." GameSpy called it "a nice change of pace" but found the game bland and considered it to be aimed more at younger children than teenagers. IGN called the gameplay "simple and well-executed", but noted that the visuals "look like the game was ripped from a PSone title" and that the audio seemed "all over the place." Charles Herold of The New York Times called the game "fun but forgettable. I was expecting something more: the feeling of complete and utter admironishment." In Japan, Famitsu gave it a score of one eight, one six, and two sevens, for a total of 28 out of 40.

According to the Guinness World Records Gamer's Edition 2009, Dog's Life holds the world record for the most video game voice-overs recorded by one person in a game. Kerry Shale voiced 32 characters from the game.

References

External links
 
 Sony Computer Entertainment Europe  - Dog's Life
 Dog's Life - Success Corp

2003 video games
Action-adventure games
Frontier Developments games
PlayStation 2 games
PlayStation 2-only games
Sony Interactive Entertainment games
Video games about dogs
Video games set in the United States
Video games developed in the United Kingdom